John M. Wood (November 17, 1813 – December 24, 1864) was a U.S. Representative from Maine.

Born in Minisink, New York, Wood attended the common schools. He engaged in railroad construction in New Jersey and moved to Portland, Maine, in 1846. He was one of the contractors in the construction of the Atlantic & St. Lawrence Railroad, and he also engaged in banking. He served as member of the Maine House of Representatives in 1852 and 1853. He was owner and publisher of the Portland Daily Advertiser from 1853 to 1857.

Wood was elected as a Republican to the Thirty-fourth and Thirty-fifth Congresses (March 4, 1855 – March 3, 1859). He was the contractor for building the Air Line Railroad between Woonsocket and New Haven, Connecticut.

Wood died while on a visit in Boston, Massachusetts, and was interred in Greenwood Cemetery, Brooklyn, New York.

References

1813 births
1864 deaths
Burials at Green-Wood Cemetery
Republican Party members of the Maine House of Representatives
Politicians from Portland, Maine
People from Minisink, New York
Republican Party members of the United States House of Representatives from Maine
19th-century American politicians